Melissa Foelsch Wells (born November 18, 1932) is a diplomat and former United States Ambassador to Cape Verde and Guinea-Bissau (1976–77), Mozambique (1987–90), Congo-Kinshasa (1991–93), and Estonia (1998–2001). She is a member of  the American Academy of Diplomacy.

Wells is the daughter of opera singer and film actress Miliza Korjus (1909–1980).

References

1932 births
Living people
Ambassadors of the United States to Guinea-Bissau
Ambassadors of the United States to Cape Verde
Ambassadors of the United States to Estonia
People from Tallinn
Walsh School of Foreign Service alumni
Recipients of the Order of the Cross of Terra Mariana, 1st Class
Ambassadors of the United States to Mozambique
Ambassadors of the United States to the Democratic Republic of the Congo
Estonian emigrants to the United States
United States Foreign Service personnel
American women ambassadors
20th-century American diplomats
21st-century American diplomats
20th-century American women
21st-century American women